Victor Edward Catrios (24 August 1903 − 19 December 1968) was a Greek-born Australian rugby league footballer who played in the 1920s.

Victor Catrios came to first grade via the Banksia Waratahs Junior Rugby League Football Club in the mid 1920s. He played two first grade games for St. George in 1926   before retiring.

Victor Catrios was the first St. George Dragons player that was born in Greece, and he more than likely the first Greek-born player from any team to play first grade rugby league in Australia.

References

St. George Dragons players
1903 births
1968 deaths
Greek emigrants to Australia
Australian rugby league players
Rugby league props
People from Symi